Jeannette Josephina Maria "Netti" Witziers-Timmer (née Timmer, 22 July 1923 – 25 January 2005) was a Dutch sprint runner. In 1944 she was a member of the Dutch teams that set world records in the 4×110 yard and 4×200 m relays. Two years later she won a European title, and in 1948 an Olympic gold medal in the 4×100 m relay. The 1948 Dutch relay team was remarkable in that all its members were married and had children.

Biography
Witziers-Timmer died on January 25, 2005. She was 81 at the time of her death.

References
 

1923 births
2005 deaths
Dutch female sprinters
Olympic athletes of the Netherlands
Olympic gold medalists for the Netherlands
Athletes (track and field) at the 1948 Summer Olympics
Athletes from Amsterdam
Medalists at the 1948 Summer Olympics
European Athletics Championships medalists
Olympic gold medalists in athletics (track and field)
Olympic female sprinters